The St. Charles Convention Center is a convention center in St. Charles, Missouri. It opened in April 2005 and is managed by Spectra.

The facility features additional meeting rooms, Executive Board Room, and the Compass Café. Other major partners include Coca-Cola, MillerCoors, Yellow Pages, New Frontier Bank, Women's Journals, and Goellner Printing.

Events
The St. Charles Convention Center hosts a variety of events throughout the year, from large consumer shows to dance competitions, conventions to small corporate meetings. Notable annual events include:
 St. Louis Best Bridal
 St. Louis Golf Show
 St. Charles Boat Show
 Working Women's Survival Show
 St. Charles Home & Garden Show
 St. Charles County Annual Mayors Ball
 St. Louis Weapon Collectors Gun & Knife Show
 St. Louis Comicon
 St. Louis Pet Expo
 Anime St. Louis

Image gallery

References

External links
 St. Charles Convention Center Official website

Convention centers in Missouri
Buildings and structures in St. Charles County, Missouri
Tourist attractions in St. Charles County, Missouri